Credit clearing is the practice according to which a small group of banks need to make many payments to each other, of adding up the payments and cancelling them out before settling the remainder. While clearing is about waiting for the payment to go through, credit clearing is about cancelling out a payment with one coming in the opposite direction.

This process originated between all the banks in London, who would send their checks to the clearing house at the end of each day. After the calculations were made there would be a single payment to or from each bank.

In 21st century with spreadsheets and blockchains, this process tends to be fully automated.

The mechanism is used not only by banks, but in any multilateral exchange situation.

Many complementary currencies work this way, calling it mutual credit.

Banking technology